An ARRT-Antenna (Cyrillic: АРРТ) is the designation of a common type used on many AM broadcasting sites in former Soviet Union, Bulgaria and Albania. It consists of a cage antenna which is mounted around the lower parts of a mast radiator insulated against ground and insulated from the mast. The mast and the cage antenna are fed separately.
The ARRT-antenna allows a radiation pattern with less skywave radio propagation and is more easily realizeable than a mast divided by insulators.

A variant of ARRT-antennas uses a grounded mast and a cage antenna reaching from the bottom to the top of the mast. Such antennas are used e.g. at the mediumwave masts of Bolshakovo transmitter.

See also
 Zarya

External links
 Pictures of a broadcasting station in Russia with ARRT-Antenna
 Theory of ARRT

Communications in Russia
Radio in the Soviet Union